Hrynko or Hrynʼko (ukr. Гринько) is a Ukrainian surname.

Notable people with the surname include:

 Brittany Hrynko (born 1993), American basketball player
 Hryhoriy Hrynko (1890–1938), Soviet Ukrainian statesman
 Mykola Hrynko (1920–1989), Soviet Ukrainian actor

Surnames of Ukrainian origin
Ukrainian-language surnames